Mario Peressin (15 May 1923, Azzano Decimo, Province of Pordenone – 11 October 1999) was the Archbishop of L'Aquila from 1983 to 1998.

External links and additional sources
 (for Chronology of Bishops)
 (for Chronology of Bishops)

1923 births
1999 deaths
People from the Province of Pordenone
20th-century Italian Roman Catholic archbishops
Bishops of L'Aquila